The Chañares Formation is a Carnian-age geologic formation of the Ischigualasto-Villa Unión Basin, located in La Rioja Province, Argentina. It is characterized by drab-colored fine-grained volcaniclastic claystones, siltstones, and sandstones which were deposited in a fluvial to lacustrine environment. The formation is most prominently exposed within Talampaya National Park, a UNESCO World Heritage Site within La Rioja Province.

The Chañares formation is the lowermost stratigraphic unit of the Agua de la Peña Group, overlying the Tarjados Formation of the Paganzo Group, and underlying the Los Rastros Formation. Though previously considered Ladinian in age, U-Pb dating has determined that most or all of the Chañares Formation dates to the early Carnian stage of the Late Triassic.

The Chañares Formation has provided a diverse and well-preserved faunal assemblage which has been studied intensively since the 1960s. The most common reptiles were proterochampsids (Chanaresuchus, Tropidosuchus, and Gualosuchus), which lived alongside true archosaurs such as Lewisuchus, Lagerpeton, Marasuchus, Gracilisuchus, and Luperosuchus. Cynodonts were abundant, represented by the medium-sized traversodontid Massetognathus, as well as smaller carnivores such as Chiniquodon and Probainognathus. The largest animal in the ecosystem was the giant dicynodont Dinodontosaurus. An older faunal assemblage, distinguished by the large erpetosuchid Tarjadia, has been discovered in the earliest part of the formation. The formation as a whole is considered one of the best sources of Carnian-age tetrapods in South America, along with the slightly younger Ischigualasto Formation which lies above the Los Rastros Formation.

Geology 
The Chañares Formation is the lowermost unit of the Agua de la Peña Group, representing the onset of the first syn-rift phase of the Ischigualasto-Villa Unión Basin. It unconformably overlies red fluvial (river) sediments of the Tarjados Formation of the Paganzo Group, and is conformably overlain by greenish lake and delta sediments of the Los Rastros Formation. The Chañares Formation has also had an interesting history with the lower part of the Ischichuca Formation. This sequence of sediments on the western edge of the basin has occasionally been considered to take priority over the Chañares Formation and the lower part of the Los Rastros Formation. However, this is rare due to the historical significance of the Chañares Formation. As a result, some authors restrict the Ischichuca Formation to a few layers of lake and delta sediments between the Chañares and Los Rastros formations, while others reject using it in the first place.

The Chañares formation was originally thought to be deposited during the Ladinian stage of the Middle Triassic. However, Uranium-Lead radiometric dating by Marsicano et al. (2016) later found that a large portion of the formation was deposited in the early Carnian (237–234 Ma), near the start of the Late Triassic. 2020 U-Pb dating of the overlying lower Los Rastros Formation yielded an age of 234.47 ± 0.44 Ma, making the vast majority of the Chañares Formation lowermost Carnian. Nevertheless, the Ladinian-Carnian boundary may still lie within the first few meters of the formation, despite the primary fossiliferous sections being well-supported as early Carnian in age.

The formation is primarily sandstone, siltstone, and claystone, arranged in a specific sequence of facies. A distinct and uneven unconformity separates the base of the Chañares Formation from the underlying Tarjados Formation. In the field, this unconformity can be identified by a high-relief layer of chert at the top of the Tarjados Formation.

Fluvial olive-grey facies 
Above this unconformity lies the oldest section of the Chañares Formation, a package of olive-grey fluvial sediments. As one goes up the section, increasingly finer beds of sandstone and siltstone are interlayered with coarser lenses, corresponding to periodic sheet floods along braided rivers. Weakly-developed palaeosols can be found within this section, filled with root traces, pebbles and small brown calcareous nodules. Winding systems of burrows have also been found in this section, likely created by small cynodonts.

Though fossils are relatively uncommon in the lower fluvial beds of the Chañares Formation, they are taxonomically and taphonomically distinct from those of succeeding layers. The most common remains are from large dicynodonts (possibly referable to Dinodontosaurus), the large erpetosuchid Tarjadia, and small non-massetognathine cynodonts closely related to Aleodon and Scalenodon. This ecosystem has been termed the Tarjadia Assemblage Zone, in order to distinguish it from the slightly younger classic Chañares assemblage. No radiometric dating has been done on this section, but it may contain the Ladinian-Carnian boundary based on dates obtained within the younger facies.

Fossiliferous bluish facies 
Above the olive-grey fluvial beds is the most fossiliferous and well-studied portion of the formation. This section is characterized by wide and massive layers of very fine bluish-grey sandstone, siltstone, and claystone. These layers have a high concentration of volcanic ash and debris, ranging from glassy shards at the base to weathered bentonites at the top. Nearby volcanic eruptions likely impacted the local climate and river systems, shifting the depositional regime from a stable braided fluvial system to one dominated by shallow floodplains and lahars. Marsicano et al. (2016) obtained a CA-TIMS U-Pb age of 236.1 ± 0.6 Ma from a siltstone bed immediately below the first major fossil layer within the bluish facies. Ezcurra et al. (2017) later studied a slightly older sandstone bed using LA-MC-IMP-MS U-Pb dating. They found a date of 236.2 ± 1.1 Ma from a cluster of the three youngest zircons.

The most productive and historically relevant fossil beds of the Chañares Formation lie within these volcaniclastic layers. The layers are replete with massive calcareous concretions, some up to 2 meters in width. They commonly preserve articulated skeletal material, often complete skeletons from multiple taxa in a single concretion. Well-preserved fossils found within concretions typically represent smaller taxa, which were buried rapidly after death. Volcanic catastrophes such as lahars, ash falls, or pyroclastic flows are the preferred cause of these rapid mass mortality events. More fragmentary fossils are also occasionally found outside of concretions, much like fossils of the underlying Tarjadia AZ. Fossils found outside concretions are typically from large animals, and were probably buried more slowly (albeit still fairly rapidly) by gradual processes.

The classic Chañares fauna, recently codified as the Massetognathus-Chanaresuchus Assemblage Zone, is characteristic of this section of the formation. The largest components of the ecosystem include dicynodonts (namely Dinodontosaurus) and indeterminate carnivorous paracrocodylomorphs, similar to taxa from the underlying Tarjadia AZ. By far the most common fossils belong to three species of cynodonts: Massetognathus pascuali, Probainognathus jenseni, and Chiniquodon theotonicus.These three species comprise nearly 3/4ths of the fossils found in the formation, with almost half of the total fossils in the formation referred to Massetognathus alone. Reptile fossils are less prevalent but more diverse, with the most common belonging to the proterochampsid archosauriform Chanaresuchus. Other notable taxa include Lagerpeton, Lagosuchus, and Lewisuchus, which were among the oldest ornithodirans, elaborating on the ancestry of dinosaurs and pterosaurs. Several communal latrines are known from the bluish facies, preserving dicynodont coprolites filled with plant remains.

Upper member 
The olive-grey fluvial section and the bluish-grey volcaniclastic section collectively form the lower member of the Chañares Formation. They are overlain by an upper member, which is practically devoid of body fossils. The upper member is generally similar to the bluish facies in appearance, with wide beds of fine-grained volcaniclastic sediments with a pale grey color. Unlike the bluish facies, concretions and body fossils are absent, having been replaced by Taenidium worm burrows. These burrows likely indicate that the environment had transitioned into a lacustrine (lake) ecosystem by the time that the upper member was deposited. Some outcrops preserve a few sandstone and conglomerate beds near the top of the upper member. These indicate that the depositional regime continued to shift towards the deltaic environment of the overlying Los Rastros Formation. The coarser beds also contain a few rare body fossils from fish and tetrapods. A white tuff near the base of the upper member has been dated to 233.7 ± 0.4 Ma, while a zircon cluster from a sandy tuff at the top of the formation was dated to 233.6 ± 1.1 Ma.

Paleobiota 
Plant remains and palynomorphs preserved in the dicynodont coprolites were described in 2018. Though it is difficult to determine the affinities of the larger plant fragments, the palynomorphs are more conclusive. They belong to a broad range of plants, most abundantly pollen from umkomasiales (a type of seed fern), and in smaller portions from podocarpean and voltzialean conifers. Spores from humid-loving groups such as bryophytes, lycopsids, true ferns, and algae were also present but rare. The palynomorph taxa generally resemble those of the Dicroidium flora which is common in other late Ladinian-early Carnian units. More precisely, the flora is intermediate between the temperate Ipswich flora of far southern Gondwana, and the hot, subtropical Onslow flora which developed  along the southern shore of the Neotethys. This transitional character is also observed in the flora of the nearby Ischigualasto Formation, as well as the Flagstone Bench Formation of Antarctica. Curiously, the Los Rastros Formation, which was deposited between the Chañares and Ischigualasto Formations, preserves a typical Ipswich flora. This likely indicates that all three formations lie at a latitude which allows them to quickly shift between the different floras during small climatic changes.

Tetrapod burrows, likely produced by small eucynodonts, have been described from the lower section of the formation.

Therapsids

Reptiles

Fish

See also 

 Ischigualasto Formation
 Los Rastros Formation
 Santa Maria Formation
 Omingonde Formation

References

Bibliography 

 
  
 
 

 
 
 
 
 
 
 
 
 
 
 
 
 
 
 
 

The Chañares Triassic reptile fauna
 
 
 
 
 
 
 
 
 
 
 
 
 
 
 
 
 
 
 
 

 
Geologic formations of Argentina
Triassic Argentina
Shale formations
Tuff formations
Fluvial deposits
Lacustrine deposits
Fossiliferous stratigraphic units of South America
Paleontology in Argentina
Geology of La Rioja Province, Argentina